Pender High School is located in Burgaw, North Carolina on Highway 53, and about 25 miles from Wilmington, North Carolina. It was established in 1975. Pender High is a 1A school with about 650 enrolled students and 56 teachers. The school's mascot the Patriots. It is in the Pender County Schools district. The principal is Caroline Godwin. Athletics offered at the school include: Basketball, Softball, Volleyball, Golf, Track, Cross Country, Tennis, Soccer, Baseball, and Wrestling.

References

External links
 Pender High School
 Pender County Schools
 
 

Public high schools in North Carolina
Schools in Pender County, North Carolina